Bernardo Florio, O.Cruc. (1587 – 14 February 1656) was a Roman Catholic prelate who served as Archbishop of Zadar (1621–1642) and Bishop of Canea (1642–1656).

Biography
Bernardo Florio was born in Venice, Italy, in 1587 and ordained a priest in the Canons Regular of the Order of the Holy Cross.
On 7 June 1621, he was appointed during the papacy of Pope Paul V as Bishop of Canea.
On 13 June 1621, he was consecrated bishop by Giovanni Garzia Mellini, Cardinal-Priest of Santi Quattro Coronati with Paolo De Curtis, Bishop Emeritus of Isernia, and Girolamo Ricciulli, Bishop of Belcastro, serving as co-consecrators. 
On 28 April 1642, he was appointed during the papacy of Pope Urban VIII as Archbishop of Zadar.
He served as Archbishop of Zadar until his death on 14 February 1656.

Episcopal succession
While bishop, he was the principal co-consecrator of:
Marino Badoer, Bishop of Pula (1641); 
Vincenzo Milani, Bishop of Caorle (1641); 
Paolo Ciera, Bishop of Vieste (1642); and 
Milano Bencio, Bishop of Canea (1642).

References

External links and additional sources
 (for Chronology of Bishops) 
 (for Chronology of Bishops) 

17th-century Roman Catholic bishops in Croatia
Bishops appointed by Pope Paul V
Bishops appointed by Pope Urban VIII
1587 births
1656 deaths
17th-century Roman Catholic bishops in the Republic of Venice